The European Leadership Network (ELNET) is a non-governmental organization whose stated mission is to strengthen relations between Europe and Israel.

ELNET was created in 2007 as a European pro-Israel advocacy group, to assist European partners become more active politically, in order to counter "widespread criticism of Israel in Europe".

ELNET is registered in Belgium, France, Germany, Israel, and Poland. The organization holds an additional US-based entity (as FELNET), solely concentration on fundraising for the entire network.

Aims and Activities

ELNET is a non-partisan organization, that works to improve strategic relations between Israel and European countries. ELNET has activity and presence in Germany, France, Spain, and Poland, as well as an office in Brussels.

The organization has interacted with European officials on numerous occasions:

"ELNET has hosted more than 50 European delegations of parliament members, top government officials, and other European policy leaders to Israel. ELNET has also held more than 20 strategic dialogues in Europe and has engaged more than 500 participants in its effort to enhance European-Israeli understanding and cooperation"

ELNET's role was defined as "encouraging Jewish political activism".

ELNET operated in Europe using similar means and mechanisms similar to the ones used by AIPAC in the U.S.:

In the United States, FELNET hosted  Manuel Valls, a former French Prime Minister, in order to raise the awareness about the importance of France-Israel relations.

ELNET was founded in 2007, first in Brussels, and later in other European capitals  - Madrid,  Spain (2008), Paris, France (2010), Berlin, Germany (2013), and Warsaw, Poland (2015), and the UK in 2020. ELNET is also registered in Israel (2010) and the Forum for Strategic Dialogue (2013) as an offspring of ELNET.

The American entity is being chaired by Larry Hochberg, a co-founder of Children's Bargain Town USA, a small chain of toy stores that operated in Chicago, as the Chairman and co-founder of Felnet.

Additional board members of Felnet include Andrew S Hochberg (son of Larry Hochberg), Leonard Foxman, Joseph Feinberg, Kenneth A Ruby, Jerry Rosenberg, Carole Mostow (secretary) and Lee Rosenblum, who is the Executive Director of Felnet.

The organization's Advisory Board Members: US Senator Joseph Lieberman, US Senator Mark Kirk, Former US Congresswoman Shelley Berkley, Former US Congressman Howard Berman, Former US Senator Norm Coleman, and Former US Deputy National Security Advisor Elliot Abrams.

It also includes Dan Meridor, a former Israeli minister, and Pierre Dassas.

See also
 American Israel Public Affairs Committee

References

Organizations established in 2007
Zionist organizations
Zionism in Europe
Lobbying organizations in Europe